Everi Holdings Inc., formerly Global Cash Access Holdings, Inc., is a company based in Spring Valley, Nevada that produces slot machines and provides financial equipment and services to casinos.

History
Global Cash Access was founded in July 1998 as a joint venture of three payment processing companies: BA Merchant Services (majority-owned by Bank of America), First Data, and USA Processing Inc. First Data contributed the assets of its gaming business, First Data Financial Services, which provided cash services at over 800 gaming properties; it had purchased the business earlier in the year from Ceridian Corporation. BA Merchant Services contributed $35 million in cash, plus its existing gaming assets, for a 21 percent stake in the business.

The company underwent a recapitalization in March 2004, repurchasing First Data's shares for $435 million, leaving M&C International with a 95% share of the company, with Bank of America owning the rest. Two months later, M&C sold a large portion of the company to a group of private equity firms led by Summit Partners for $316 million.

GCA debuted on the New York Stock Exchange in September 2005, raising $240 million in an initial public offering.

In 2009, gaming regulators recommended denying renewal of the company's license to do business in Arizona casinos, because of allegations that Global Cash Access had defrauded banks out of $26 million in transaction fees between 1999 and 2002, by miscoding Visa cash advance transactions as retail purchases. In response, co-founders Karim Maskatiya and Robert Cucinotta, who had been sharply criticized by the regulators, sold their 26 percent interest in the company, and GCA ultimately paid $1 million to Arizona to settle the investigation.

Global Cash Access expanded into the slot machine business by purchasing Texas-based slot maker Multimedia Games for $1.2 billion in December 2014. The company changed its name to Everi Holdings in August 2015, to reflect its broader business model.

In February 2022, Everi acquired the Australia-based company, ecash Holdings Pty Ltd - a developer and provider of cash handling and financial payment solutions for the gaming industry. The deal was worth $23.54 USD million.

In May 2022, Everi Holdings announced the company’s acquisition of Florida based historical horse racing (HHR) software developer and manufacturer, Intuicode Gaming. The deal is worth a total consideration of $25 million. 

In October 2022, Everi Holdings announced it had acquired the mobile technology and e-commerce platform, Venuetize Inc.

References

External links

Companies based in Spring Valley, Nevada
Gambling companies established in 1998
1998 establishments in Nevada
Companies listed on the New York Stock Exchange
Gambling companies of the United States